Countercurrent may refer to:
Countercurrent pool
Countercurrent exchange
Countercurrent chromatography
Equatorial Counter Current
Counter-Currents, an alt-right online publication
Countercurrents.org, an Indian news website
two political party factions in Italy:
Countercurrent (PRC faction, Italy), a faction of the Communist Refoundation Party
Countercurrent (PdL faction, Italy), a faction of The People of Freedom

See also
Counter currency, an element of a currency pair in foreign exchange
Against the Current (disambiguation)